The Game Is Over (original title La Curée, "The Kill") is a 1966 French-Italian French language drama film directed by Roger Vadim and starring Jane Fonda, Michel Piccoli and Peter McEnery. The film is a modern-day adaptation of the 1871-72 novel La Curée by Émile Zola.

Synopsis
In Paris, Maxime Saccard visits his wealthy industrialist father Alexandre and his beautiful young Canadian wife, Renée. Alexandre fathered Maxime years ago in a prior marriage and Maxime has come to stay with them after studying in England.

Renée tells Maxime that she married Alexandre when she was pregnant following an unhappy love affair; the child was stillborn and the passion between the two has faded.

Renée and Maxime begin an affair and fall in love with each other. Renée, who came from a wealthy family, asks Alexandre for a divorce. He agrees, on the condition that she leaves the fortune she brought to their marriage invested in his business.

Renée accepts this and goes to Switzerland for a divorce. But while she is away, Alexandre confronts his son with two alternatives: he can either run off with the now penniless Renée or become engaged to Anne Sernet, the daughter of a wealthy banker whose support Alexandre wants for his business. Maxime agrees on the second course of action.

Renée returns from Switzerland to find Alexandre holding a ball celebrating Maxime's engagement to Anne. Renée throws herself into the pool to kill herself – but then changes her mind and dripping wet enters the party. Alexandre escorts her to the gymnasium, where she sits and stares into an empty future.

Cast 
 Jane Fonda: Renée Saccard
 Michel Piccoli: Alexandre Saccard
 Peter McEnery: Maxime Saccard
 Tina Aumont: Anne Sernet 
 Jacques Monod: M. Sernet
 Howard Vernon: Lawyer
 Douglas Read: Hotel manager
 Ham-Chau Luong: M. Chou 
 Germaine Montero: Guest 
 Joé Davray: The gardener (uncredited)
 Hélène Dieudonné : The maid (uncredited)
 Van Doude: Guest (uncredited)
 Simone Valère: Mme. Sernet (uncredited)
 Dominique Zardi: Guest (uncredited)

Production
The movie was one of a series Vadim made based on a classic text. He described the book as "about high society in Paris with a rather serious background, since it likens dogs turning on a deer in a hunt to people."

"I am making no attempt to give the wide sociological picture that Zola did", added Vadim. "I am not a naturalist or a moralist. The Zola characters were hardly everyday. There was something fantastic about them, though they have their counterparts today, as I hope to show."

Vadim and Jane Fonda married immediately prior to making the film.

It was only the second film performance of Tina Aumont.

The movie was shot in both English and French versions. Fonda acted in French and English. "I said it was hard enough to shoot anything once", she said. "But doing it twice, I found, seemed perfectly natural.

"I love working in French", she added. "I feel a certain kind of freedom. The way you feel when you learn to speak a foreign language and find you can say things you wouldn't dare say in English."

Peter McEnery did not speak French so when shooting the French version he had to learn his lines phonetically and a French actor was then dubbed in for him.

Fonda appears in some nude scenes which were explicit for the time. She said later about shooting these:
You have to be relaxed, free. Pornography begins when things become self-conscious. But the set was cleared and closed, and I knew Vadim would protect me in the cutting room. Months later we discovered that a photographer had hidden in the rafters and taken pictures which he sold to Playboy. It rocked me, it really did. It's a simple matter of breaking and entering, and invasion of privacy.

Reception
The movie was a solid box office success in France, where it received mostly good reviews. It was the tenth most popular movie at the French box office in 1966, after La Grande Vadrouille, Dr Zhivago, Is Paris Burning?, A Fistful of Dollars, Lost Command, A Man and a Woman, For a Few Dollars More, The Big Restaurant and The Professionals.
When the film screened at the Venice Film Festival, however, critical reception was hostile.

When the movie was screened commercially in Italy later, all copies were seized on the grounds of obscenity. The Italian producer and 23 cinema owners were charged. Vadim and Fonda were not charged.

US Release
The Game Is Over received mostly negative reviews in the US. Critics praised the cinematography by Claude Renoir, but called the film's story and dialogue trite. New York Times reviewer Bosley Crowther wrote that the film "has absolutely nothing in it but fancy clothes and decor", while critic Roger Ebert called it "a tedious and ridiculous film of great physical beauty". The Washington Post called it 'this deliciously false and phony picture."

However the Los Angeles Times called it Vadim's "best film since Les Liaisons Dangereuses and the finest of Miss Fonda's career... Rarely has Vadim's style been so expressive."

References

External links 
 
The Game is Over at TCMDB

1966 films
French drama films
Films based on works by Émile Zola
Films directed by Roger Vadim
Films set in Paris
English-language French films
1960s French-language films
1960s French films